Gary Baker, known professionally as Gary Go, is a British songwriter, producer, composer and media artist. He has written and produced songs performed by artists including Rihanna, Robbie Williams, Steve Angello, Benny Benassi, Gryffin, Take That, Celeste, Majid Jordan, Aloe Blacc, Sara Bareilles, Chiiild, Milky Chance, The Knocks, Ruby Rose,  Borgore, The 2 Bears, Party Pupils, Kylie, Ronan Keating, Morgxn, Simply Red, Katharine McPhee, Joseph Arthur, Thomas Azier, Carina Round, Laleh, Anthony Ramos and Juliette Lewis.

Overview
His debut artist album Of Youth/Of Beauty spawned the international hit single "Wonderful". Upon the album's release, Lady Gaga referred to Gary Go as "my favourite new artist this year" after performing a rendition of "Just Dance", inspired by his cover of the song. Gaga then invited Go to join her on her European tour. Tours with MIKA and Snow Patrol followed.

Gary Go went on to collaborate with electro DJ/producer Benny Benassi, writing and performing three consecutive #1 club records ("Close to Me", "Control" and "Cinema"). "Cinema", rose rapidly to No. 1 on the US Billboard and UK Club charts and received a Grammy Award for the remix by electronic music producer Skrillex. "Cinema" is widely recognised as a seminal dance record, included in Billboard's "Best Dance Songs of the Decade"  and "Top EDM Love Songs of All Time" retrospectives. Artist and producer Kanye West referred to it as "one of the greatest works of art ever made".

As a solo artist, Go went on to release Now Was Once the Future (2012), a videotape and original soundtrack, and Love Lost Freedom Found (2020), a live museum exhibit and accompanying soundtrack album, inspired by the Museum of Broken Relationships. Earmilk referred to the album as a "visceral narrative that explores the cavernous depths of human relationships."

Gary Go composed the original score for two feature films by German filmmaker Simon Verhoeven; the hit cultural comedy Wilkommen bei den Hartmanns and the cyber-horror Friend Request (included in Metal Hammer's "Ten Horror Soundtracks to Scare Your Pants Off!" feature).

Innovation
Gary Go has gained publicity and media attention for his use of technology and social media tools. He was the first artist to use Twitter as a tool for collaborative songwriting  and an early adopter of integrating the iPhone into studio and live applications.

Works

Artist discography
2020 || "Love Lost Freedom Found" (album/exhibit)
2018 || "Cinema - Acoustic" (single)
2015 || "Crying Sound" (audiovisual) 
2014 || "Through the Walls" (audiovisual)
2012 || "Now Was Once the Future" (audiovisual EP)
2009 || "Of Youth/Of Beauty" (album)
2009 || "Wonderful" (single) 
2005 || "The Diary of Rodney Harvey" (EP)
2005 || "So So..." (EP)

Songwriter discography
(π Also producer)
(∆ Also featured vocalist)

2023 || "Invisible" - Thomas Azier
2022 || "It Is What It Is" - Milky Chance
2022 || "London Bridge" - Dave Rowntree 
2022 || "Good Tonight" - Anthony Ramos (OST "The Bad Guys" | Dreamworks)
2022 || "Come With Me" - Yola (Opening titles - "Green Eggs & Ham" Season 2 | Netflix)
2022 || "Ain't Me Without You" - WEISS
2021 || "Hold On Til We Get There" - Chiiild
2021 || "Tape Over It" - Nathan Ball
2021 || "Believe" π - Aloe Blacc - (End titles - "The Rescue" | National Geographic)
2021 || "Japanese Trees" π - Koates
2021 || "Waves of Blue", "Forget About The Party", "Life Worth Living" - Majid Jordan
2021 || "Cinema" ∆ - Galantis
2020 || "Little Runaway"  - Celeste
2020 || "Wonder" - MORGXN, Sara Bareilles, Jagwar Twin
2020 || "West Coast Tears" ∆ - Party Pupils
2020 || "Get Older", "Bittersweet", "Lose Touch", "The Moment", "Ghosts" - remme
2020 || "Cry ft. John Martin" - Gryffin
2020 || "Map Of Your Loneliness" - Thomas Azier
2017 || "The Last Spark" - Jamie Lawson
2016 || "Love My Life" π - Robbie Williams
2015 || "Towards The Sun" π - Rihanna (OST "Home" | Dreamworks)
2015 || "Prisoner" ∆ - Steve Angello
2015 || "Your Body ft. Giorgio Moroder" - Kylie
2015 || "School Daze" - Borgore
2014 || "Boom" - Laleh
2014 || "Let In The Sun", "Into The Wild" - Take That
2014 || "Not This Time" - The 2 Bears
2014 || "Let This Last Forever" ∆ - Benny Benassi
2014 || "Open Heart" ∆ - (OST Just Before I Go)
2013 || "Adrenaline" ∆ - Sam LaMore
2012 || "Marcel Marcel (The Arrangement)" - Carina Round
2012 || "Guilty Pleasure" ∆ - Ruby Rose
2012 || "Wasted Light" - Ronan Keating
2012 || "The Song I Sang Before I Met You - Sylvie Lewis (OST "Echo Park")
2011 || "Cinema", "Close To Me", "Control" ∆ - Benny Benassi
2011 || "Magic" ∆, "The Prize" π, "R.O.Y.L" - The Knocks
2010 || "It's Not Right" - Katharine McPhee
2009 || "Backseat" - Carina Round
2007 || "Sing" ∆ - (OST Freefonix | BBC)
2007 || "Come To You" - Carina Round

Composer
2020 || U R OK || Digital Media Series || Composer
2016 || Wilkommen bei den Hartmanns || Feature || Composer
2016 || Friend Request || Feature || Composer
2011 || Männerherzen 2 || Feature || Additional Score
2007 || Reflections Of A Skyline || Short || Composer

Print
2011 || My First Twook || Illustrated book of Gary Go's tweets (illustrations by Flo Chaplin) || Author

References

External links
 Gary Go - Spotify Profile
 Gary Go - Apple Music Profile
 Gary Go - Official Youtube Channel
 Gary Go - IMDb Profile

English songwriters
English male composers
English male singers
English pop singers
English record producers
Musicians from Wembley
Living people
1985 births
21st-century British singers
Decca Records artists
Polydor Records artists